Iqbal Imam (born 17 July 1969) is a Pakistani former cricketer. He played in 147 first-class and 115 List A matches between 1989 and 2005. In April 2019, he was appointed as the batting coach of the Pakistan women's cricket team, ahead of their tour to South Africa.

References

External links
 

1969 births
Living people
Pakistani cricketers
Karachi cricketers
Pakistan Customs cricketers
Pakistan National Shipping Corporation cricketers
Public Works Department cricketers
United Bank Limited cricketers
Place of birth missing (living people)